Pekanbaru is the capital of Indonesian province of Riau, and a major economic center on the eastern part of Sumatra Island. Its name is derived from the Malay words for 'new market' ('pekan' is market and 'baru' is new).
It is located on the banks of the Siak River, which flows into the Strait of Malacca, Pekanbaru has direct access to the busy strait and has long been known as a trading port.

A settlement has existed on the site since the 17th century. In the late 19th century, the city was developed to serve the coffee and coal industries, and the Dutch built roads to help ship goods to Singapore and Malacca. This city has an airport called Sultan Syarif Kasim II International Airport, and a port called Sungai Duku that is located by the Siak River.

History

Sultanate of Siak
The origin of Pekanbaru was inseparable from the existence of the Siak River as a distributing route for commodities from the Minangkabau Highlands to the Strait of Malacca. During the 18th century, Senapelan region on the banks of the Siak River became a market for the Minangkabau merchants. Over time, the area evolved into a crowded residential area. On June 23, 1784, based on the consultative meeting of the Council of Ministers from Sultanate of Siak Sri Indrapura, consisting of four tribal leaders (datuk) of Minangkabau tribes (Pesisir, Lima Puluah, Tanah Datar and Kampar), the area was named Pekanbaru. This date was later celebrated as the anniversary of this city.

Dutch East India Company
In 1749, under the terms of a peace treaty between the Sultan of Johor and the Dutch East India Company (VOC), Siak was put under the Dutch administration. The Sultan moved residence to a palace in Senapelan built in 1760.

At Senapelan Sultan Abdul Jalil Shah Alamudin unsuccessfully tried to organize a major regional fair. In the early 1780s his son Sultan Muhammad Ali managed to establish the grand fair. Due to the important commercial value for Sumatra region and Malacca Strait for general, the settlement itself was renamed Pekanbaru by the local council of tribal elders (consist of Datuk Pesisir, Datuk Limapuluh, Datuk Tanah Datar and Datuk Kampar) on 23 June 1784. Thus, 23 June is celebrated as the founding day of Pekanbaru.

Dutch East Indies
Following the collapse of the Dutch East Indies Company (VOC), all company ownership of Pekanbaru was transferred to the Dutch crown. During the colonial Dutch East Indies era in the 19th and early 20th century the city remained important, especially as a major trading point: Siak river navigation conditions provide a stable relationship with shipping from the Malacca Strait. Additionally the city became a major center of the coffee industry and coal industry. The urban influence of the sultans gradually became more and more nominal, especially after the capital of the Sultanate moved to Sri Indrapura in 1830. Actual management functions were carried out by representatives of the Dutch colonial administration, i.e., by the post of assistant-resident and controller.

Second World War
During the Second World War from February 1942 to August 1945 the city was occupied by the armed forces of Japan. In an effort to strengthen the military and logistical infrastructure in this part of Sumatra, the Japanese started the construction of a 220-kilometer-long railway, connecting Pekanbaru to the coast of Malacca Straits.

The Pekanbaru Railway was constructed under harsh conditions using forced labour. 6,500 Dutch, mostly Indo-Europeans, and British prisoners of war and over 100,000 Indonesian, mostly Javanese, forced workers called Romusha were put to work by the Japanese army. By the time the work was completed in August 1945 almost a third of the European POWs and over half of the Indonesian coolies had died.

The average age at death of the 700 prisoners of war who perished on that railway was 37 years and 3 months.

The railway was never fully utilised. Today it remains unused and in an advanced state of decay.

Indonesian era
After Indonesian independence, Pekanbaru was organized as an administrative city in 1956, and was selected to be the capital of the newly formed Riau province in 1959.

Politics
Since 1946, Pekanbaru has been governed by at least 15 mayors. The first mayor to rule this city was Datuk Wan Abdul Rahman who was elected on 17 May 1946. Currently, the Mayor of Pekanbaru is Muflihun

Reputation

Pekanbaru is one of the cleanest big cities in Indonesia. In 2011, Pekanbaru received the "Adipura" ('cleanest city') award in the category of large city for the seventh consecutive time.

Demographics

Ethnicities
Pekanbaru is the third most populous city on Sumatra Island after Medan and Palembang, with a population of 983,356 according to the official Census for 2020. The city is highly urbanised, drawing many of its people from the neighbouring province of West Sumatra. Since many centuries ago, Pekanbaru is one of the Minangkabau migration area. After World War II, the number of Minangkabau people migrating to Pekanbaru surged, nearly doubling between the years 1943 and 1961. Many Minang in Pekanbaru have lived there for generations and has since assimilated into the Malay community. In addition to the Minangkabau, the Riau Malays natives are the second largest ethnic group in Pekanbaru, making up 30% of the population. The Javanese, Batak, and Tionghoa are the other main ethnic groups inhabiting Pekanbaru.

Religions
The pluralism surrounding the city can be reflected by the variety of religions and freedom of belief among the people in Pekanbaru. Islam is the majority religion in this city, followed by Christianity (Protestantism and Catholic) as well as Buddhism and small percentage of Hinduism and Confucianism. Each religion in this city is represented by the presence of the religion's respective worship places, such as An-Nur Great Mosque and Pekanbaru Central Mosque (Masjid Raya Pekanbaru) for the Muslim community, St. Maria A Fatima Church and St. Paulus Church for the Catholic community, Huria Kristen Batak Protestan Church for the Protestant community as well as Vihara Dhamma Metta Arama, Vihara Dharma Loka and Vihara Vimala Virya for the Buddhist community and Kwan Tee Kong Bio (Vihara Satya Dharma) and Vihara Sasana Loka for Confucianist community and Pura Agung Jagatnatha for the Hindu community in Pekanbaru.

Languages
Indonesian is the official language that is spoken by the citizens of Pekanbaru. For informal use, Pekanbaru people generally use Minangkabau language in their economic and daily activities, especially in the market area. In addition the Malay languages and Javanese are also widely spoken because of the large population of Malays and Javanese people in Pekanbaru. Hokkien is mainly spoken by Tionghoa as most of the Chinese Indonesian in Pekanbaru belong to the Hokkien people. In fact, many Chinese Indonesian in Pekanbaru come from other regions in Riau such as Selat Panjang, Bengkalis and Siak, along with the Chinese Indonesian who are originally from Pekanbaru itself. Moreover, many Chinese Indonesian especially from North Sumatra, particularly the Medan and West Sumatra regions have moved to Pekanbaru due to opportunities and rapid economical growth in the area since the 1990s and 2000s.

Administrative districts

The city is divided into fifteen administrative districts, formerly twelve (Indonesian: kecamatan), tabulated below with their areas and their populations. The table also includes the number of administrative urban villages (kelurahan) in each district.

There are no data for the individual area of Tuah Madani and Binawidya, as both districts previously fell under the same district of Tampan. Together, both districts comprise 59,81 km2.

Climate
Pekanbaru has a tropical rainforest climate under the Köppen climate classification. As with many cities with an equatorial climate, the temperature only varies a little throughout the year. The hottest month is May with average temperature , while the coolest month is January with average temperature . The precipitation accumulation also remains constant throughout the year with no real dry season. The month with most precipitation is November with precipitation total , while the least precipitation is July with precipitation total .

Economy
After oil was discovered in the region in the 1930s, Pekanbaru's economy has depended heavily on oil revenues which caused the city to have the highest per capita income in Indonesia. Most of Indonesia's petroleum is produced in Riau, and much of Pekanbaru's economy is based on the petroleum industry. International oil companies, prominently Chevron from the US, as well as other Indonesian companies, have established their offices in the region. The city is connected by road to an oil refining and exporting port in Dumai. Many facilities and infrastructures such as an airport, stadiums, housing areas, schools, bridges that cross the Siak River in Pekanbaru, the roads in Rumbai and the roads to Dumai, were partially or fully financed by oil companies in the area.

Pekanbaru is really close with some of the home of mega-companies, such as PT Riau Andalan Pulp Paper, PT. Indah Kiat, PT. Chevron Pacific Indonesia, and PT Perkebunan Nusantara V and some wood-sawmill, CPOs, and rubber-processing companies, and Pekanbaru is often said to be one of the cities with the highest money and banking rotation in Indonesia.

As Pekanbaru is prominently known as a major gateway for tourists from Singapore and Malaysia, the city has become a favourite stop-over for travellers before they go further inland to other regions of Sumatra Island such as Padang and Jambi. The Pasar Pusat (Central Market) is a food-trip destination and considered a household-goods trove. Pasar Bawah and Pasar Tengah, located near to the port and Siak riverbank, are especially known for the marketplace for buying and selling of Chinese goods like ceramics and carpets.

Around 127,000 foreign tourists arrived in Pekanbaru through its airport during 2018.

On the other hand, there are many developments of shopping malls such as Plaza Senapelan, Plaza Citra, Plaza Sukaramai, Mal Pekanbaru, Mal SKA, Sadira Plaza, Living World, Transmart Mini Studio, Mal Ciputra Seraya, Lotte Mart, Metropolitan Trade Center, The Central, Ramayana, Robinson, Metro, and Giant Grocery Store. Additionally, there are a lot of housing areas have been developed since the 2000s surrounding the city, particularly in Panam area whereby the housing project along the road has been tremendously established and now becoming one of the most populous area in Pekanbaru even though it is located far from downtown.

Favorably, there are several landmarks that have been built in this city. For example, The Great Mosque of An-nur, Mesjid Raya Pekanbaru, Pasar Bawah or Tourist Market, Riau Bank Tower, Riau Government Office Tower, Siak IV Bridge, Zapin Dance Monument and there are many more to come.

Transportation

There are several modes of transportation in Pekanbaru such as taxi, bus, oplet (share taxi), bajaj (auto rickshaw), ojek (motorcycle taxi) and Trans Metro Pekanbaru (bus rapid transit). However, due to the rapidly increasing number of motorised vehicles, the traffic congestion that occurs on some roads such as Jalan Sudirman, Jalan Riau and Jalan HR. Subrantas that mainly connect populous sub-districts in the city cannot be avoided any more particularly during weekends and holidays. These problems initiated the government of Pekanbaru to come up with plans to solve these matters, especially within 10 to 15 years ahead.

Land

For land transport, Pekanbaru is connected to Padang, Medan, Jambi, Palembang, and other cities or regions in Riau Province and Sumatra Island by the existence of Bandar Raya Payung Sekaki Bus Terminal. The terminal was officially open for public in 2007, replacing Pekanbaru's former "Mayang Terurai Terminal Bus" due to heavy congestion. However, the Bandar Raya Payung Sekaki Bus Terminal is not fully utilised by several prominent bus companies such as Pelangi, Makmur, Riau Mandiri and Sidomulyo as well as other bus operators because its location which is deemed by some parties to be not as strategic as Mayang Terurai Bus Terminal. These matters surely make some bus companies have no choice but to drop off the passengers outside the designated zone. This informal drop-off zone is usually called by local people as terminal bayangan ("shadow terminals").

Rivers
Port of Sungai Duku is located by the Siak River, connecting Pekanbaru with some regions in Riau Province and Riau Islands such as Siak, Tanjung Buton, Selat Panjang, Bengkalis and Batam. In the past, there were ferry services travelling from this port directly to Malacca in Malaysia, but the service was discontinued as several ferry companies decided to move their operations to Tanjung Buton.

Air

Sultan Syarif Kasim II International Airport serves flights in Pekanbaru from/and to several cities in Indonesia such as Batam, Medan, Bandung, Jakarta, Yogyakarta, Surabaya, and others, and international flights to several countries such as Malaysia, Singapore, Saudi Arabia, and Sri Lanka.  Several prominent domestic airlines serve the route from/and to Pekanbaru such as Citilink, Garuda Indonesia, Lion Air, Batik Air, Indonesia Air Asia, Susi Air, Super Air Jet and Wings Air. International flights are presently provided by AirAsia, Jetstar Asia Airways, Malindo Air, Scoot and Batik Air Malaysia

In 2012, the new terminal was opened, replacing the old terminal that had been used since the 1980s. The old terminal is planned to be demolished to build more spaces for the apron and more aircraft capacity. Even though the new terminal has been fully used, the aerobridges that were constructed have never been utilized as the apron expansion has not been completed yet after two years since the opening of the new terminal to the public in 2012. Thus, the airport company PT Angkasa Pura II is currently ferrying passengers to and from the terminal using shuttle buses until the aerobridge can be used.
Pekanbaru's airport is also utilized separately as the airbase of the TNI-AU (Indonesian Air Force) and home base of the 12th Squadron, a shelter to some Hawk Mk.109s and Mk.209s. The airbase is named after the former head of Indonesian Air Force, Roesmin Nurjadin and formally called as Pangkalan Udara Roesmin Nurjadin or Roesmin Nurjadin Airbase.

Education
Pekanbaru has a formal and informal form of education. Pekanbaru currently implements a "zonation" system to assign new students in public schools.

Sports

Football is the most popular sport in Indonesia. In Pekanbaru, PSPS Pekanbaru is the local club that has been competing in Indonesian Super League since the 2000s. Kaharudin Nasution Sport Center Rumbai Stadium is the home stadium for PSPS Pekanbaru.

In 2012, 2013 AFC U-22 Asian Cup qualification, 2012 Pekan Olahraga Nasional (Indonesian National Games) and 2012 Pekan Paralympic Nasional was held in Riau Province. Since then, many sport facilities have been built in Pekanbaru because this city was the home for many sports venues used these multi-national events, such as the prominent Riau Main Stadium. Unfortunately, many sports facilities that have been developed before the 2012 Pekan Olahraga Nasional are not being managed and taken care of properly. An example would be the Riau Main Stadium, which was never used again after the event until today due to financial disputes between the local government and the contractors of the stadium.

Several golf courses can be found in Pekanbaru, such as Pekanbaru Golf Course Country Club at Kubang Kulim, Simpang Tiga Golf Course at AURI Complex, Rumbai Golf Course at IKSORA Rumbai Complex and Labersa Golf Course at Labersa Hotel and Convention Center.

Media
The TVRI Riau (state-owned) and Riau TV (private) are some of the popular local television stations in Pekanbaru. Several local newspapers operating in Pekanbaru, such as Riau Pos, Haluan Riau, Tribun Pekanbaru, Pekanbaru Pos, Pekanbaru MX and Koran Riau.

Sister cities

References

External links

 https://web.archive.org/web/20110202232824/http://thepekanbaruguide.com/
 Books about the construction of The Sumatra Railroad by POW and Romushas during the Second World War

 
Populated places in Riau
Provincial capitals in Indonesia
Cities in Indonesia
Cities in Riau